La Oreja de Van Gogh (English: "Van Gogh's Ear") is a Spanish pop band from Donostia-San Sebastián, Spain. The band's lyrics and compositions are written primarily by Xabi San Martín, and additionally by Pablo Benegas and Amaia Montero (who remained in the group until her departure in 2007). The lyrical themes of their songs typically include love, friendship and relationships.  Since their debut, they have sold more than 8 million albums worldwide.

In November 2007, lead singer Amaia Montero announced that she would be leaving the group to begin a solo career. Her replacement, Leire Martínez, was announced in July 2008; the first single featuring the new singer, "El Último Vals" (The Last Waltz), was released at the same time. The album from which the single was taken, A las cinco en el Astoria, followed in September 2008. Leire was discovered on the Spanish reality show Factor X.

History

Fronted by Amaia Montero (1996–2007) 

The band was formed under the provisional name Los Sin Nombre (The Nameless) in 1996 by four college students from San Sebastián: Xabi San Martín (keyboard), Pablo Benegas (guitar), Álvaro Fuentes (bass guitar) and Haritz Garde (drums). They recorded covers of songs from international rock bands, such as U2, Pearl Jam and Nirvana, usually with San Martín providing lead vocals.

As they began to write songs, the band wanted to recruit a female lead vocalist. They met Amaia Montero at a friend's party, and after listening to her sing "Nothing Compares 2 U" by Sinéad O'Connor, Benegas convinced her to join the group. She subsequently became the lead singer and frontwoman of the band. After several meetings in local cafés, Montero suggested La Oreja de Van Gogh (Van Gogh's Ear) as the definitive name of the band, inspired by the story of Vincent van Gogh severing one of his ears.

The band first rose to prominence when it won a local pop-rock music festival in San Sebastian, giving the group the chance to record a 4-song EP. This encouraged the band to send some of their songs to major record companies, with Sony Music-scout Jennifer Ces being the first one interested in the band after listening to only one of the band's songs. She urged them to send her more of their songs to see if they had enough material for an LP. After composing and submitting over 20 tracks in a very short period of time, Ces reacted very positively and signed the band to Epic Records, a subsidiary of Sony. Manolo Moreno, one of Epic's managers at the time, reportedly said after listening to some of the band's material: "This is the new Mecano".

In 1998, La Oreja de Van Gogh released its debut album Dile al sol (Tell the Sun), produced by Alejo Stivel, earning praise from contemporary critics and performing well in the Spanish Albums Chart. The album sold more than 800,000 copies and was certified 7-time platinum, and the band received an Ondas Award for Best New Act.

The success of the band was further increased with the release of El viaje de Copperpot (Copperpot's Journey, a reference to the character Chester Copperpot from the movie The Goonies) in 2000 and Lo que te conté mientras te hacías la dormida (What I Told You While You Pretended to Be Asleep) in 2003. Both albums were produced by Nigel Walker and managed to sell more than 2 million copies worldwide each, establishing La Oreja de Van Gogh as one of the most popular bands in Spain as well as in Latin America. El viaje de Copperpot was certified diamond in Spain for shipments of over 1,000,000, and singles "La Playa" ("The Beach"), "Puedes Contar Conmigo" ("You Can Count on Me") and "Rosas" ("Roses"), amongst others, were international hits in most Spanish-speaking countries.

In 2006, the band released what would be its fourth and last studio album with Amaia Montero. Guapa (Beautiful) was the best-selling album of 2006 in Spain and won a Latin Grammy for Best Pop Album by a Duo or Group and a 40 Principales Award for Best Spanish Album. Singles "Muñeca de Trapo" ("Rag Doll") and "Dulce Locura" ("Sweet Madness") were also very successful, peaking at number 1 in many charts, including the Mexican Singles Chart and the Argentinian Charts. Late in the same year, the band re-released the album as a new edition called Más Guapa (More Beautiful), which included a second CD with tracks made for but cut from all of the band's albums since 1998, including both unreleased songs and some alternative versions of previously released tracks. One of the former was released as a single, "En Mi Lado del Sofá" ("On My Side of the Sofa"), which has since become La Oreja de Van Gogh's last single before changing its line-up.

Fronted by Leire Martínez (2008–present)

In 2007, Amaia Montero left the group and Xabi, Pablo, Álvaro and Haritz held an audition looking for a new vocalist. In July 2008 they presented Leire Martínez as the new vocalist and the new song "El Último Vals" as the first single of their new album A las cinco en el Astoria (At Five O'Clock At the Astoria).

In 2009, they released Nuestra casa a la izquierda del tiempo  (Our home on the left side of time), which consisted of re-recordings of their older songs with Martinez, the new vocalist, plus one new song.

Their next studio album proper was Cometas por el cielo  (Comets in the sky), released in 2011, with the first single sharing the name of the album.

In 2013, they released a new album called Primera Fila (First Row), a live recording of previous songs as well as some new tracks including the single El primer día del resto de mi vida (The First Day of the Rest of my Life).

In 2016, they released El planeta imaginario (The Imaginary Planet), and in December of that same year, started a tour showcasing its songs.

In December 2019, the group made an announcement on their official Facebook page, saying that they will start recording their new album on January 7, 2020.

On April 13, 2020, the group released the first single called "Abrázame" of their new album, titled Un susurro en la tormenta (A Whisper in the Storm), that would be released around September. On July 2, the band released another song from their upcoming album, "Te pareces tanto a mí". Later that month, the complete tracklist and the album release date were revealed, with the latter being September 18.

Members 
 Current members
 Leire Martínez – lead vocals (2008–present)
 Pablo Benegas – guitars (1996–present)
 Xabi San Martín – keyboards (1996–present)
 Álvaro Fuentes – bass (1996–present)
 Haritz Garde – drums (1996–present)

 Former members
 Amaia Montero – lead vocals (1996–2007)
 Luis Meyer – guitars (1996)

Timeline

Discography

Studio albums
 Amaia Montero
 1998: Dile al sol
 2000: El viaje de Copperpot
 2003: Lo Que te Conté Mientras te Hacías la Dormida
 2006: Guapa
 Leire Martinez
 2008: A las Cinco en el Astoria
 2011: Cometas por el cielo
 2016: El Planeta Imaginario
 2020: Un Susurro en la Tormenta

Filmography
 1999: Dile al sol - VHS
 2002: El viaje de Copperpot - VHS & DVD
 2003: Lo que te conté mientras te hacías la dormida, Gira 2003 CD+DVD
 2010: Un viaje por el Mar Muerto, their first full-length feature film, which was filmed in Israel in collaboration with other artists. Included as a bonus disc in the special edition of Nuestra casa a la izquierda del tiempo.
 2012: Cometas por el Cielo - En directo desde America: Second CD-DVD filmed in Mexico and in Argentina.

References

Basque music bands
Spanish musical groups
Latin Grammy Award winners
Sony Music Spain artists
Latin pop music groups
MTV Europe Music Award winners